Adam Robert Slater (13 March 1934 – 24 August 1994) was an Australian rules footballer who played with Footscray in the Victorian Football League (VFL).

Notes

External links 

1934 births
1994 deaths
Australian rules footballers from Victoria (Australia)
Western Bulldogs players